This is a list of all seasons played by GNK Dinamo Zagreb in national and European football, from 1945 (the year the club was officially founded) to the most recent completed season. The club spent its entire existence playing top-flight football (from 1946 to 1991 in the Yugoslav First League, from 1991 onwards in the Prva HNL).

This list details the club's achievements in all major competitions, and the top scorers for each season (note that only goals scored in league matches are taken into account). Players in bold were also top league scorers that season.

Seasons

Key
Divisions
1. JSL = Yugoslav First League 1946–1991
1. HNL = Croatian First League 1992–present

League
P = Games played
W = Games won
D = Games drawn
L = Games lost
GF = Goals for
GA = Goals against
Pts = Points
Pos = Final position
N/A = Not applicable

Cup/Europe
PR = Preliminary round
PO = Play-off round
QR = Qualifying round
R1 = Round 1
R2 = Round 2
R3 = Round 3
GS = Group stage
QF = Quarter-finals
SF = Semi-finals
RU = Runners-up
W = Winners

1946–1991
Following the club's formation as the municipal multi-sports club FD Dinamo in June 1945 the club's first competitive success was winning the first post-war Zagreb municipal championship held in January and February 1946 and then finishing as runners-up behind Hajduk Split in the SR Croatia regional championship which doubled as a qualifying tournament for the 1946–47 Yugoslav First League (officially called "First Federal League"), the first edition of the post-war national top level. Dinamo soon established themselves as one of the so-called "Big Four" of Yugoslav football (along with Hajduk Split, Partizan and Red Star), a quartet of teams who dominated the game in SFR Yugoslavia, by finishing runners-up in 1947, and winning league titles in 1948, 1954 and 1958 and were never relegated from top level until leaving the league in 1991 following Croatia's independence. During the Yugoslav era Dinamo won four league titles and seven Yugoslav Cups. They were only the third Yugoslav side to play in an UEFA-sponsored competition when they appeared in the 1958–59 European Cup (after Partizan in 1955 and Red Star in 1956).

The club's most successful period was between 1960 and 1969, during which they reached the Yugoslav Cup finals six times (winning four) but failed to clinch a single league title (finishing runners-up five times). The club also had two successful campaigns in the Inter-Cities Fairs Cup during this period, reaching the final in 1963 and 1967 and winning the latter by beating England's Leeds United. This was the only European silverware won by any Yugoslav club until Red Star Belgrade won the 1990–91 European Cup 24 years later. The club's second "golden age" came between 1980 and 1986, when Dinamo reached another five cup finals (winning two) and won the 1981–82 league title, their first league win in 24 years.

In the Yugoslav era three Dinamo players were top league scorers on four occasions: Franjo Wölfl in 1947 and 1948, Dražan Jerković in 1962 (who also went on to become joint top scorer at the 1962 FIFA World Cup that year) and Snješko Cerin in 1982. Cerin went on to become the club's most prolific scorer in the period with a total of 103 league goals for Dinamo between 1976 and 1986. The most successful managers were Milan Antolković who led the club to three cup finals (1960, 1963 and 1963 - winning the first two) and the Inter-Cities Fairs Cup final in 1963; and Miroslav Blažević who led the club to the 1981–82 league win and three cup finals (1982, 1983 and 1986 - winning only the 1983 edition).

1992–present
Following the 1990–91 Yugoslav First League Croatian clubs abandoned the league amid the breakup of Yugoslavia and joined the present-day Croatian football league system as the country declared independence. Dinamo Zagreb were thus founding members of the Prva HNL (1. HNL). Affected by the ongoing war in Croatia the league's inaugural season was shortened and held over the course of only one calendar year from February to June 1992. During the season the club took part in European competitions on account of qualification secured at the end of the 1990–91 Yugoslav season as Dinamo had finished runners-up in the league and qualified for the 1991–92 UEFA Cup. Due to the ongoing war Croatian clubs had to host their European games abroad so Dinamo played their UEFA Cup first round fixture against Trabzonspor in Klagenfurt, Austria. The following 1992–93 season no Croatian club was allowed to enter European competitions as the Croatian Football Federation, the league's governing body, was not yet recognized by UEFA and officially became its affiliate as late as June 1993.

Amid political turmoil in the early 1990s club's officials began claiming direct lineage to pre-WWII Zagreb-based clubs Građanski Zagreb and HAŠK and in order to reflect this Dinamo were renamed "HAŠK Građanski" in June 1991. They finished fifth in the inaugural 1. HNL season and reached the Croatian Cup final which they lost to minnows Inker Zaprešić. In February 1993 the club were renamed "Croatia Zagreb". They won five league titles and three domestic cups and participated in the 1998–99 and 1999–2000 UEFA Champions League group stages carrying that name before reverting to "Dinamo Zagreb" in February 2000.

Notes
 Between the 1988–89 and 1991–92 seasons drawn games went to penalties with only the shootout winners gaining the point. Figures in brackets in the drawn games column represent points won in such shootouts.
 Includes only goals scored in league matches. Players indicated in bold were also top league scorers that season.
 The 1952 Yugoslav First League was shortened and completed over a period of three and a half months, beginning on 2 March and ending on 22 June. The reason for the changes was a desire to start the next season in the fall of 1952, thus implementing the fall–spring format that had become a norm all across Europe by this time. The clubs were initially divided into two groups of six teams each, where everyone within a given group played each other twice (home and away). After ten rounds Dinamo topped their group and qualified for the four-team championship group in the second stage in which four best-placed teams from preliminary groups played each other twice. Eventually Dinamo finished fourth, six points behind winners Hajduk Split. The statistics for the 1952 season thus show season totals and not just the final standings in the second stage group.
 In the 1955–56 and 1974–75 seasons the Yugoslav Cup was not held. On both occasions the cup edition was skipped for rescheduling purposes as the Yugoslav FA had decided to move the date of cup finals from 29 November (or Republic Day, the anniversary of the establishment of communist Yugoslavia) to on or around 25 May (or Youth Day, a national holiday which doubled as the official celebration of Josip Broz Tito's birthday).
 Due to the match-fixing scandal in the 1985–86 season, ten clubs had started the 1986–87 Yugoslav First League season with a deduction of 6 points, among them Dinamo Zagreb. Vardar, who had not been deducted any points, won the title and participated in the 1987–88 European Cup, with Dinamo originally finishing eighth in the league. After post-season legal proceedings the situation was resolved in July 1987 with a court ruling which nullified the deductions and which meant that the title was given back to Partizan and that Dinamo finished the season in sixth place.

Achievements

Domestic
 Croatian First League
Winners (23): 1992–93, 1995–96, 1996–97, 1997–98, 1998–99, 1999–2000, 2002–03, 2005–06, 2006–07, 2007–08, 2008–09, 2009–10, 2010–11, 2011–12, 2012–13, 2013–14, 2014–15, 2015–16, 2017–18, 2018–19, 2019-20, 2020-21, 2021-22

Runners-up (4): 1994–95, 2000–01, 2003–04, 2016–17
 Yugoslav First League
Winners (9): 1923, 1926, 1928, 1936–37, 1939–40, 1947–48, 1953–54, 1957–58, 1981–82
Runners-up (11): 1946–47, 1951, 1959–60, 1962–63, 1965–66, 1966–67, 1968–69, 1976–77, 1978–79, 1989–90, 1990–91
 Croatian Football Cup
Winners (15): 1994, 1996, 1997, 1998, 2001, 2002, 2004, 2007, 2008, 2009, 2011, 2012, 2015, 2016, 2018, 2021
Runners-up (7): 1992, 1993, 1995, 2000, 2014, 2017, 2019
 Yugoslav Football Cup
Winners (7): 1951, 1960, 1963, 1965, 1969, 1980, 1983
Runners-up (8): 1950, 1964, 1966, 1972, 1976, 1982, 1985, 1986
 Croatian Super Cup
Winners (6): 2002, 2003, 2006, 2010, 2013, 2019
Runners-up (4): 1993, 1994, 2004, 2014
 Yugoslav Super Cup
Runners-up (1): 1969

International
 Inter-Cities Fairs Cup
Winners (1): 1966–67
Runners-up (1): 1962–63
 Balkans Cup
Winners (1): 1976

References
General

Specific

Seasons
 
Dinamo Zagreb
Dinamo Zagreb Seasons
Gnk Dinamo